Ugbad Abdi is an American fashion model. Born in Somalia and raised in a Kenyan refugee camp and Des Moines, Iowa, she debuted as a Valentino haute couture model, then opened shows for Marc Jacobs and Michael Kors at New York Fashion Week. She is the first model to walk shows for Fendi and Lanvin while wearing hijab.

Early life 
Abdi was born in Kismayo, Somalia. Her family fled the Somali Civil War, first to a refugee camp in Kenya, then in 2009, when Abdi was nine years old, to Des Moines, Iowa with the help of UNICEF. Shortly after graduating from high school in Des Moines, Abdi was scouted on Instagram. She visited New York for the first time to meet with agency representatives, and signed with Next Management.

Career 
Abdi made her runway debut in the 2018/2019 Valentino haute couture show. She has opened New York Fashion Week shows for Marc Jacobs and Michael Kors. Abdi has also walked in shows for Chanel, Miu Miu, Simone Rocha, Burberry, Fendi, Lanvin, Max Mara, and Dries van Noten. In April 2019, she appeared in British, American, and Arabian editions of Vogue simultaneously. Abdi has been called "one of Fall 2019's breakout models". In 2022, she appeared on the cover of Vogue France with Danish model Mona Tougaard.

Personal life 
Abdi is Muslim, and began wearing hijab at the age of fourteen. She wears head coverings while modeling, and in 2019 became Fendi and Lanvin's first runway model to wear hijab. She has five siblings, two of whom were born after the family moved to the United States. She speaks Somali and English.

References 

Living people
American Muslims
American people of Somali descent
Female models from Iowa
Year of birth missing (living people)
People from Des Moines, Iowa
Next Management models
Muslim models
21st-century American women